Laughing Sinners is a 1931 American pre-Code Metro-Goldwyn-Mayer feature film starring Joan Crawford and Clark Gable in a story about a cafe entertainer who experiences spiritual redemption. The dialogue by Martin Flavin was based upon the play Torch Song by Kenyon Nicholson. The film was directed by Harry Beaumont. Laughing Sinners was the second of eight cinematic collaborations between Crawford and Gable.

Cast
 Joan Crawford as Ivy Stevens
 Neil Hamilton as Howard Palmer
 Clark Gable as Carl Loomis
 Marjorie Rambeau as Ruby
 Guy Kibbee as Cass Wheeler
 Cliff Edwards as Mike
 Roscoe Karns as Fred Geer
 Gertrude Short as Edna
 George Cooper as Joe
 George F. Marion as Humpty
 Bert Woodruff as Tink

Production

Casting
John Mack Brown was originally playing Gable's role when the studio decided to scrap his footage and reshoot the part with Gable taking Brown's place. At that point, Brown's distinguished career in mainstream feature films ended forever and he wound up demoted to cowboy B pictures, with his name changed to "Johnny Mack Brown."

Crawford and Rambeau, who both play chorus girls in Laughing Sinners, would go on to play mother (Rambeau) and daughter (Crawford) in the film Torch Song in 1953. "Torch Song" is the name of the play on which Laughing Sinners is based.

Reception

Critical reception
Andre Sennwald commented in The New York Times, "Miss Crawford...has tempered the intense and not a little self-conscious quality of her acting without hurting her vibrant and breath-catching spirit."

Box office
According to MGM records the film earned $624,000 in the US and Canada and $141,000 elsewhere, resulting in a profit of $156,000.

See also
 Clark Gable filmography

References

External links 
 
 
 
 

1931 films
1931 drama films
American black-and-white films
American drama films
American films based on plays
Films directed by Harry Beaumont
Metro-Goldwyn-Mayer films
The Salvation Army
1930s English-language films
1930s American films